The White House Iraq Group (aka, White House Information Group or WHIG) was a working group of the White House set up in August 2002 and tasked with disseminating information supporting the positions of the George W. Bush administration relating to a possible invasion of Iraq, which would subsequently take place in March 2003. 

The task force was set up by White House Chief of Staff Andrew Card and chaired by Karl Rove to coordinate all of the executive branch elements in the run-up to the war in Iraq.  However, it is widely speculated that the intention of the task force was "escalation of rhetoric about the danger that Iraq posed to the U.S., including the introduction of the term 'mushroom cloud'" .

Timeline
Soon after WHIG was formed, the Bush Administration's claims about the danger Iraq posed escalated significantly:

 July 23, 2002:  The Downing Street Memo was written, in which British intelligence said "C reported on his recent talks in Washington. There was a perceptible shift in attitude. Military action was now seen as inevitable. Bush wanted to remove Saddam, through military action, justified by the conjunction of terrorism and WMD. But the intelligence and facts were being fixed around the policy."
 August, 2002:  White House Iraq Group formed.
 September 5, 2002: In a WHIG meeting, chief Bush speechwriter Michael Gerson proposes the use of a "smoking gun/mushroom cloud" metaphor to sell the American public on the supposed nuclear dangers posed by Saddam Hussein. According to Newsweek columnist Michael Isikoff, "The original plan had been to place it in an upcoming presidential speech, but WHIG members fancied it so much that when the Times reporters contacted the White House to talk about their upcoming piece [about aluminum tubes], one of them leaked Gerson's phrase — and the administration would soon make maximum use of it." (Hubris, p. 35.)
 September 6, 2002:  In an interview with the New York Times, White House Chief of Staff Andrew Card did not mention the WHIG specifically but hinted at its mission: "From a marketing point of view, you don't introduce new products in August."  On September 17, 2002, commentator Matt Miller stated on NPR that the Card's statement was in response to the question: "... why the administration waited until after Labor Day to try to sell the American people on military action against Iraq" 
 September 7, 2002: Judith Miller of The New York Times reports Bush administration officials said "In the last 14 months, Iraq has sought to buy thousands of specially designed aluminum tubes, which American officials believe were intended as components of centrifuges to enrich uranium." In fact, many government officials had concluded the tubes were unsuitable for uranium refinement.
 September 7–8, 2002:  President Bush and a plurality of top advisers blanketed the airwaves, talking about the dangers posed by Iraq.
 On NBC's "Meet the Press," Vice President Dick Cheney cited the New York Times article, and accused Saddam of moving aggressively to develop nuclear weapons over the past fourteen months to add to his stockpile of chemical and biological arms.
 On CNN, Condoleezza Rice acknowledged that "there will always be some uncertainty" in determining how close Iraq may be to obtaining a nuclear weapon but said, "We don't want the smoking gun to be a mushroom cloud."
 On CBS, President Bush said U.N. weapons inspectors, before they were denied access to Iraq in 1998, concluded that Saddam was "six months away from developing a weapon." He also cited satellite photos released by a U.N. agency Friday that show unexplained construction at Iraq sites that weapons inspectors once visited to search for evidence Saddam was trying to develop nuclear arms. "I don't know what more evidence we need," Bush said.
 October 14, 2002: President Bush says of Saddam "This is a man that we know has had connections with al Qaeda. This is a man who, in my judgment, would like to use al Qaeda as a forward army." 
 January 21, 2003: Bush says of Saddam "He has weapons of mass destruction -- the world's deadliest weapons -- which pose a direct threat to the United States, our citizens and our friends and allies." 
 February 5, 2003: Colin Powell addresses the United Nations, asserting that there was "no doubt in my mind" that Saddam was working to obtain key components to produce nuclear weapons.
 March 19, 2003:  The U.S. invades Iraq.

Members
The members of the White House Iraq Group include: 

 Karl Rove
 Karen Hughes
 Mary Matalin
 Andrew Card
 Dan Bartlett
 James R. Wilkinson
 Condoleezza Rice
 Stephen Hadley
 I. Lewis (Scooter) Libby
 Michael Gerson
 Rendon Group
 Ari Fleischer

Response to Yellowcake Forgery Issue
In response to the Yellowcake forgery issue, the White House Iraq Group devised a strategy to combat critics:

"There is a strategy now, devised by White House communications director Dan Bartlett, Mary Matalin, a former aide to Vice President Cheney, and former Bush aide Karen Hughes. Both advise the White House as a consultants to the Republican National Committee.

The plan: Release all relevant information. Try to shift attention back to Bush's leadership in the war on terrorism. Diminish the significance of that single piece of iffy intelligence by making the case that Saddam was a threat for many other reasons. Put Republican lawmakers and other Bush allies on TV to defend him.

Most important: Question the motives of Democrats who supported the war but now are criticizing the president."

From British Report:

From our examination of the intelligence and other material on Iraqi attempts to buy uranium from Africa, we have concluded that:

a. It is accepted by all parties that Iraqi officials visited Niger in 1999.

b. The British Government had intelligence from several different sources indicating that this visit was for the purpose of acquiring uranium. Since uranium constitutes almost three-quarters of Niger's exports, the intelligence was credible.

c. The evidence was not conclusive that Iraq actually purchased, as opposed to having sought, uranium and the British Government did not claim this.

d. The forged documents were not available to the British Government at the time its assessment was made, and so the fact of the forgery does not undermine it.

CIA leak scandal
Records and notes of White House Iraq Group activities were subpoenaed by Special Counsel Patrick Fitzgerald as part of the investigation into the leak of CIA operative Valerie Plame's identity.

References

CNN (2002). Top Bush officials push case against Saddam.  Accessed on July 21, 2005.
Washington Post (2003). Depiction of Threat Outgrew Supporting Evidence. Accessed on July 21, 2005.
USA Today (2003). Questions dog White House days. Accessed on July 26, 2005.
White House Archives (2002). Remarks by the President at Thaddeus McCotter for Congress Dinner. Accessed on July 26, 2005.
White House Archives (2003). President Bush Meets with Leading Economists. Accessed on July 26, 2005.
New York Times (2002). U.S. Says Hussein Intensifies Quest for A-Bomb Parts. Accessed on July 26, 2005.
Hubris Hubris: The Inside Story of Spin, Scandal, and the Selling of the Iraq War, Michael Isikoff and David Corn, Crown Publishers, New York (published September 8, 2006).

External links
 Profile: White House Iraq Group, SourceWatch.
 Profile: White House Iraq Group, Center for Cooperative Research.
 White House Iraq Group, Daily Kos.
Not One Claim Was True, by Joseph Cirincione
 Hoodwinked: The Documents That Reveal How Bush Sold Us a War, Prados, John (Ed.), (2004), 
Blindsided or blind?, by John Prados Bulletin of the Atomic Scientists, July/August 2004
Air Force One records subpoenaed in CIA leak probe
The Value Proposition
Armitage Said Joe Wilson Told Everyone About Plame
Iraq The War Card Center for Public Integrity 9/11–September 2003
Bush Expresses Regret For 'Rhetoric' Leading to Iraq War VOA News 11 June 2008

Iraq War
Plame affair
United States government propaganda organizations
George W. Bush administration controversies